All I Need is the second studio album by English singer-songwriter Foxes, released on 5 February 2016.

Background
Foxes started work on the album in January 2015 in Los Angeles. Commenting on the album's direction, Foxes said "I was inspired a lot more with this record with stripping things back and making it a lot more emotional. I didn't want to do a concept album, I always like it when I can write from a diary in a way. It's quite an emotional album. It's got elements from the first one, but it's definitely not as produced. The tracks feel a lot more vocal [with] piano and strings. It's still cinematic in ways but I'm a lot more honest on this record this time around, which is quite a scary thing to be." She has also said that the album was inspired by relationships.

Critical reception

All I Need received generally positive reviews from music critics. At Metacritic, which assigns a normalized rating out of 100 to reviews from mainstream critics, the album has an average score of 67 out of 100, which indicates "generally favorable reviews" based on 9 reviews.

Promotion

Singles
"Body Talk" was released as the album's lead single on 24 July 2015 in the United Kingdom.

On her Facebook page, Foxes announced that the second single would be "Better Love", co-written by Dan Smith from Bastille. The song which features Smith's vocals was released on 4 September 2015.

"Amazing" was released as the album's third single on 4 December 2015.

"Cruel" was released as the album's fourth single on 19 April 2016, the same day that its video was released.

Other songs
A video for "Feet Don't Fail Me Now" was launched by H&M as part of the H&M Loves Music campaign.

"If You Leave Me Now" was released on 27 November 2015 as a promotional single.

"Devil Side" was released on 26 December 2015 as a promotional single. This was followed by the release of "Wicked Love" on 29 January 2016, a week before the album's release.

Acoustic versions
Acoustic versions of a few tracks from All I Need have been released onto Vevo. All of them feature Foxes singing into a mic and Sam Kennedy, Foxes' keyboard player for live performances, playing the piano. The acoustic version for "Devil Side" was uploaded on February 7, 2016. The acoustic version for "Scar" was released on February 23, 2016. The acoustic version for "On My Way" was released on February 28, 2016.

Commercial performance
All I Need sold 7,724 copies in its first week inside of the United Kingdom, which resulted in a debut chart position of 12. As of November 2016 the album has sold 13,000 copies in the UK and 16,500 worldwide. According to Official Charts Company data, All I Need has vended 36,463 copies to date.

Tour
In July 2015, Foxes announced a tour in anticipation of the release of the album throughout October 2015.

Track listing

Personnel
Musicians

 Foxes – vocals
 Ben Kennedy – drums (tracks 1, 2, 4, 6, 9–14, 16), percussion (1, 4, 6, 9, 11, 13, 14, 16), background vocals (6, 9, 11)
 Sam Kennedy – keyboards (1, 4, 9, 11, 13, 14, 16), programming (1, 4), background vocals (9, 11, 13, 14), percussion (9, 11), piano (9–14, 16)
 Rosie Langley – violin (1, 16)
 Dan Smith – background vocals (2)
 Jonny Harris – background vocals (2)
 Roy Kerr – keyboards, programming (2, 10, 12); performance arrangement (12)
 Sam Dixon – keyboards (2, 6), background vocals (6)
 Tim Bran – keyboards, programming (2, 10, 12); background vocals, guitar (10)
 Davide Rossi – strings (2, 10)
 Jim Eliot – drums, guitar, keyboards, synthesizer (3, 5)
 Sally Herbert – performance arrangement (5)
 Chris Worsey – cello (5)
 Ian Burdge – cello (5)
 Bruce White – viola (5)
 Max Baillie – viola (5)
 Rachel Robson – viola (5)
 Alison Dods – violin (5)
 Everton Nelson – violin (5)
 Ian Humphries – violin (5)
 Julia Singleton – violin (5)
 Richard George – violin (5)
 Rick Koster – violin (5)
 Tom Pigott-Smith – violin (5)
 Dan Wilson – bass guitar, drums, organ, piano, strings (7)
 Felix Snow – programming (7)
 John Rausch – programming (7)
 Brian Brundage – synthesizer (7)
 Ken Chastain – tambourine (7)
 Jesse Shatkin – bass guitar, piano, programming (8)
 Danny Levin – brass (8)
 Erick Serna – guitar (8)
 Peter Lee Johnson – violin (8)
 David Moyer – woodwinds (8)
 Charlie Fowler – bass guitar (9, 11), background vocals (11)
 Juliet Roberts – background vocals (10, 12)
 Alfie Ralph – vocals (11)
 Arthur Anstee – vocals (11)
 Betty Pearce – vocals (11)
 Billy-Ray Ralph – vocals (11)
 Bluebelle Carroll – vocals (11)
 Cassady Carroll – vocals (11)
 Darcey Garland – vocals (11)
 Frida Storp – vocals (11)
 Harvey Anstee – vocals (11)
 Jack Garland – vocals (11)
 Jade Morgan Meredith – vocals (11)
 Kitty Faith – vocals (11)
 Lily Turner – vocals (11)
 Madeline Bruce – vocals (11)
 Misty Soni – vocals (11)
 Ronnie Ball – vocals (11)
 Roxy Harcourt – vocals (11)
 Savannah Lumley – vocals (11)
 Scarlett Faith – vocals (11)
 Sylvie Turner – vocals (11)
 Tippi Rose Bruce – vocals (11)
 Hannah Robinson – background vocals (15)
 Theo Vinden – cello (15)
 Natalie Cavey – viola (15)
 Gillian Maguire – violin (15)
 Stephanie Cavey – violin (15)

Technical
 Matt Colton – mastering
 Mark Ralph – mixing (1, 3–7, 9–14, 16)
 Mark Stent – mixing (2)
 Liam Howe – mixing (15)
 Jesse Shatkin – mixing, engineering (8)
 Drew Smith – engineering (1, 4, 5, 7, 9–14, 16)
 Tom Fuller – engineering (1, 4, 5, 7, 9–14, 16)
 Jack Ruston – engineering (2, 10, 12)
 Julian Burg – engineering (8)
 Geoff Green – engineering assistance (2)

Charts

References

2016 albums
Foxes (singer) albums
Sony Records albums